The 2021 Great Lakes Intercollegiate Athletic Conference men's basketball tournament was a postseason men's basketball tournament for the GLIAC of the 2020–21 NCAA Division II men's basketball season which took place March 2–5, 2021. The Semi-Finals and Finals were played in John Friend Court in Hammond, Indiana, with the first two rounds being held at the home stadium of the team that had the better record of their respective matchup. For example, the matchup between #3 Michigan Tech and #6 Purdue Northwest would be hosted by Michigan Tech.

Ashland defeated Michigan Tech 85–77 in the championship game to win the college's first GLIAC tournament title. As a result of the win, they received the conference's automatic bid to the NCAA DII tournament.

Seeds
Ten of the GLIAC members and affiliate members participated in the GLIAC Tournament. Teams were seeded by conference record, with a tiebreaker system used to seed teams with identical conference records. The top 6 teams received a first round bye. Tiebreakers occurred if two teams received the same amount of points for the tournament.

Schedule

*Game times in Eastern Time. #Rankings denote tournament seeding.

Bracket

Game summaries

First round

Quarterfinals

Semifinals

Championship

References

College sports tournaments in Indiana
Basketball competitions in Indiana
GLIAC Conference men's basketball tournament
GLIAC men's basketball tournament
Hammond, Indiana